Okasaki (written: 岡咲) is a Japanese surname. Notable people with the surname include:

Chris Okasaki, American computer scientist
, Japanese voice actress

See also
12439 Okasaki, a main-belt asteroid
Okazaki (disambiguation)

Japanese-language surnames